Aik Gunnah Aur Sahi is a Pakistani Urdu film directed by Hassan Tariq, and based on short story "Mummy" by Saadat Hassan Manto.

Plot 

Mummy, a supplier of young girls loves one of her girl as her daughter, yet she has no hesitations to sent her to rich men to spend night with them. One day, she comes across a man who saves her life by taking her to hospital. After knowing her more, he decides to marry her, Mummy allows to do so but hides her past. He brings her to his house where she shocks to see his father-in-law, the same person who had spend a night with her.

Cast 

 Rani
 Mohammed Ali
 Sabiha Khanam
 Shahid
 Nayyar Sultana
 Darpan

Guest 
 Agha Talish
 Aslam Pervaiz
 Ilyas Kashmiri
 Kemal Irani

Release 

Aik Gunnah Aur Sahi was released on 25 July 1975. It ran for 52 consecutive weeks in Karachi.

Soundtrack

Reception 

The film received 4 Nigar Awards in 1975 in the following categories.

References

External links 
 

Films based on short fiction
Urdu-language Pakistani films
1970s Urdu-language films